The 1994–95 DFB-Pokal was the 52nd season of the annual German football cup competition. 64 teams competed in the tournament of six rounds which began on 13 August 1994 and ended on 24 June 1995. In the final Borussia Mönchengladbach defeated VfL Wolfsburg 3–0 thereby claiming their third title.

Matches

First round

Second round

Round of 16

Quarter-finals

Semi-finals

Final

References

External links
 Official site of the DFB 
 Kicker.de 

1994-95
1994–95 in German football cups